The Grand Opera House, also known as The Grand or Masonic Hall and Grand Theater, is a 1,208-seat theater for the performing arts in Wilmington, Delaware, United States. The four-story building was built in 1871 by the Delaware Grand Lodge of Masons to serve as a Masonic Temple and auditorium. The construction cost was $100,000.  It was designed in Second Empire style by Baltimore architect Thomas Dixon and incorporates symbolism from Freemasonry into the cast-iron facade.  Its central pediment contains an Eye of Providence.

Historically, the Grand hosted a variety of operas, symphonies, Victorian melodramas, minstrel shows, burlesque, vaudeville, and other exhibitions, including performers such as Ethel Barrymore, "Buffalo Bill" Cody and "Texas Jack" Omohundro, and John Philip Sousa. For most of the twentieth century the Grand was operated exclusively as a movie theater, run by Warner Brothers from 1930 and eventually closing in 1967.  It was reopened four years later and returned to programming emphasizing classical music, partnering with the Delaware Symphony Orchestra, OperaDelaware, and the First State Ballet Theatre.

It was listed on the National Register of Historic Places in 1972 with assertions of both architectural and historical significance.  It was argued it is "one of the finest remaining examples of 19th century cast iron architecture in America" and that it has important association with events and persons in Delaware's history.

In 1973, management was turned over to a non-profit organization and the building underwent extensive restoration, which was completed in 1976.

See also

 Delaware Children's Theatre
 National Register of Historic Places listings in Wilmington, Delaware

References

External links

Grand Opera website
First State Ballet website
OperaDelaware website
Delaware Symphony Orchestra website

Grand Opera House - Wilmington, Wanda Kaluza, video

Ballet venues
Buildings and structures in Wilmington, Delaware
Clubhouses on the National Register of Historic Places in Delaware
Dance venues in the United States
Event venues on the National Register of Historic Places in Delaware
Former Masonic Buildings in Delaware
Historic American Buildings Survey in Delaware
Masonic buildings completed in 1871
Music venues completed in 1871
Music venues in Delaware
National Register of Historic Places in Wilmington, Delaware
Opera houses in Delaware
Opera houses on the National Register of Historic Places
Performing arts centers in Delaware
Second Empire architecture in Delaware
Cast-iron architecture in the United States
Theatres completed in 1871
Theatres on the National Register of Historic Places in Delaware
Thomas Dixon (architect) buildings
Tourist attractions in Wilmington, Delaware